The Irish Free State Army Intelligence Department – Oriel House Criminal Investigation Department was a department that was responsible for gathering intelligence and enforcement of locations under the control of the IRA as a quasi-police force against those who opposed the newly created Irish Free State (IFS) during the 1920s.

At least twenty-five Irish republicans were assassinated in County Dublin during the period that the Oriel House CID was in existence, from early 1922, when under the control of the Free State Army Intelligence Department and later under the Ministry of Home Affairs, to November 1923 when it was finally abolished.

The Irish Free State Army Intelligence Department
When the Truce of July 1921 was enacted, many among the Irish Republican movement believed that violence and tensions would decrease. Michael Collins kept the pressure on his intelligence network and expanded intelligence gathering against potential enemies. By the time of the inactment of the Anglo-Irish Treaty, Collins feared that there may be conflict between factions within the Irish Republican movement. When the Treaty was accepted, Collins gave his Intelligence Department a new headquarters at Beggars Bush Barracks on Haddington Road and later transferred the department to Wellington Barracks on the South Circular Road as the Irish Civil War developed.

Although many people joined the Irish Free State Army intelligence, some members of this organisation include: all of the former IRA Intelligence, Liam Tobin, Joseph MacGrath, Tom Cullen, Charlie Saurin, Ed Flood, Charlie Dalton, et al. The complete 'Squad', although some were now in uniform and commanding troops. At Wellington Barracks where the 'G' men of the Dublin Metropolitan Police (DMP) who had covertly assisted the IRA from 1919 to 1921. People like Ned Broy (Broy was later transferred to the Civil Aviation Department at Baldonnel Aerodrome and later was appointed 'Adjutant and O/C Ground Organisation, Air Force' by November 1922)(See Irish National Army Census of November 1922) David Neligan,(Nelligan was sent to Kerry with the 'Dublin Guards' as Divisional Intelligence Officer) Joe Kavanagh and Jim McNamara. Lastly, there was a large group of former Irish Republican Police, led by Peter Ennis, brother of General Tom Ennis. Even though Collins had castigated the IRP in the past, he now accepted them into the new Free State Army Intelligence Department. A few new people were also recruited to the department, young men like Michael Joe Costello and Daniel Bryan, both of whom would rise to high office in later years in the army.

The anti-Treaty IRA faced this substantial set-up at Wellington Barracks as the Civil War loomed. They had now formed an Executive and had barricaded themselves into the Four Courts buildings on the Quays to resist pro-treaty forces.

Organisation

The origins of the CID at Oriel House are vague. The earliest mention of this organisation is in the form of an application for membership from Peter Ennis of the Irish Republican Police. It was a non-statutory body, an adjunct of the Intelligence Department of the pro-treaty section of the IRA. Its activities were veiled in secrecy, and today it is greatly difficult to locate any files on the actual work they carried out. From being a quasi-military body in early 1922, it transmuted into a quasi-police force in August of the same year and remained so until it was disbanded in the latter months of 1923.

The FSA Intelligence Department took over the spacious Oriel House early in 1922. Liam Tobin, now a major general in the FSA, was installed here as director-general of the newly established CID. One of the first decisions made was to appoint a deputy to Tobin in this new organisation. Collins is now installed as Director, Patrick Moynihan, with the rank of captain. Moynihan had been a head investigator in the Postal Service and was seconded to the new CID. He had been a valuable intelligence contact in the Irish Post Office during the 'Tan War' and was close to both Collins and Griffith. The next appointment was Peter Ennis of the Irish Republican Police, also with the rank of captain. Ennis then moved from his office at 24 Great Brunswick Street (HQ of the Dublin IRP) and transferred some of his IRP personnel to the building known as Oriel House. The building would also be used later on by the Protective Corps, whose job it was to guard all government buildings, the GPO, large banks and several government Ministers, Senators and their homes. A further organisation would use Oriel House as a headquarters later in 1922. This was the CDF (Citizens' Defence Force), a secretive body composed chiefly of ex-British soldiers. They were an armed organisation and numbered about one hundred members. They duplicated some of the work of the Protective Corps, guarding banks and cinemas and patrolling the city's streets. They never revealed their names when submitting reports, using a personal number instead.

The cost of the CID and the Protective Corps was provided for in the CID estimates. The CDF was provided for under the Secret Service estimates.

Oriel House CID

For the first six months of its existence, the CID was under the control of the FSA Intelligence Department. It had a major general in charge, a captain as his deputy, and the lower ranks were sergeants, corporals and privates. They had the use of Irish army vehicles and motorcycles. The CID was set up to combat the rise in armed crime in the city, as many robberies and assaults had occurred. There was still great animosity by British authorities, citizens allied with the pro-British bloc, and the 'G men', and they were not proving reliable and had been moribund since the Truce of 1921. 

Oriel House was built in 1872 and served several purposes. It was at one time the head office of the Dunlop Company. (The name over the door today says 'Dunlop Oriel House') It also served as a police station for the DMP, when the Great Brunswick Street station was being renovated. It is an imposing building and served the purpose well for the CID. It had an unobstructed view right up Merrion Square and of many government buildings. It was on a corner of two main thoroughfares, with no rear entrance, and easy to defend. There were also several cells in the basement area of the building for holding prisoners.

Early activity
In the early months of its existence, the newly formed CID kept its activities to a minimum. Gathering intelligence, making contacts and performing bodyguard duties were the day-to-day duties of the members. One file shows the whole complement of Oriel House divided into three groups. Each group had Lieutenants, Sergeants and Corporals in charge. Possibly there were three shifts operating at the time. Fifty-two revolvers, (Colts, Webleys and Smith & Wessons) with 1000 rounds of .45 ammunition, six Lee–Enfield rifles with 200 rounds of .303 ammunition, and one Lewis Light Machine Gun with 14 pans of ammunition, were issued to the CID. At one stage there were over one hundred and twenty men on the CID pay sheets, meaning not everyone would have been armed all of the time.

Transport was provided by the FSA at Portobello Barracks and consisted in the early months of one Crossley tender, one motor-car and one motor-bike. In later months the CID ran into an amount of trouble when it commandeered cars from the public at will. The CID maintained and serviced its own vehicles and had a mechanical staff specifically for that purpose.

Several files at the NA (H196/3) show the amount paid weekly to the CID.

 Captain Moynihan £250 Per Annum
 Captain Ennis £6.14.7
 Lieutenant £4-10-0
 Sergeant £4-0-0
 Corporal £3-15-0
 Private £3-10-0

Moynihan also received his Post Office salary during his tenure at Oriel House.

Over one hundred and twenty sheets are on file, giving background information on candidates to the CID. The average age was thirty-three years, and most men were Dublin born. The majority had prior service in the IRA, but there were at least three ex-RIC men, one ex-American cop, and two ex-British Army people. The oldest recruit was forty-seven years of age, and the youngest was sixteen. (He was a boy clerk within Oriel House, and he was later transferred to FSA Intelligence Dept. at Wellington Barracks at the behest of Col. Charlie Dalton) There was one non-national in the CID. This was Charles Wineman, a German national who was the manager of Barry's Hotel, Dublin, and claimed that he was a confidant of Michael Collins. (H169)

Changeover
A government decision was made after the fall of the Four Courts, and Oriel House CID was transferred from the FSA Intelligence Dept. to the Ministry of Home Affairs on 21 August 1922 (the day before Michael Collins death). Major General Joe MacGrath became the Director-General, answering Kevin O'Higgins, the Minister of Home Affairs.

"Collins appointed him (MacGrath) Director of Intelligence in July 1922, he presided over some of the more grisly aspects of the treaties counter-insurgency policy".

Patrick Moynihan was retained as Director, holding the rank of captain. All the other subordinates now adopted police ranks. Ennis became Chief Superintendent, and so on down the ranks, where the Privates became Detective Officers.

"It (the CID) rapidly earned itself an unenviable reputation for toughness, unscrupulousness, and violence".

O'Higgins is on record as saying, ..."what was needed to put down the 'Irregulars', were more local executions, and we should just kill them anyway". This was premeditation, and this outburst must have given his agents in Oriel House the confidence to go out and be assured that there would be little outcry when they carried out extrajudicial killings. The worst excesses of the killing squads took place under O'Higgin's stewardship of the CID. (File S1411, Taoiseach's Dept. NA)

In 1926 MacGrath was accused of knowing who had killed Noel Lemass, whose body was dumped in the Featherbeds in the Dublin Mountains, and three teenage Fianna (republican boy Scouts) members, Edwin Hughes (17), Joseph (16) and Brendan Holohan (16), who was murdered in Clondalkin, and with having failed to pursue the matter. This charge against him was in a book, "The Real Ireland", published in Britain by a Morning Post journalist named Brethetron. MacGrath was in retirement at this time, and he brought a civil action against the author for libel. He won his case because the Irish State would not attend the court or produce the relevant files to the defendants. The case was won on this point, but the accusation remained. (See File S4786, Taoiseach's Dept, NA)

In February 1923, Oriel house CID took up residence at 88 Merrion Square. The Protective Corps had now come under the command of the CID also at this time. File H169/3, Justice Dept. shows that there were now;
30 efficient Detective Officers
175 House and personal guards
60 street patrols
40 Observers or 'Touts'
8 Women observers
50 part-time volunteers

Timeline
After the fall of the Four Courts Garrison and the defeat of the rearguard action in central Dublin, the IRA adopted new tactics in the metropolitan area. A low-intensity guerrilla war was conducted against the army of the Irish Free State Provisional Government. This was proving hard to combat, so the FSA adopted the policy of rounding up and interning all known activists who opposed the new state. When this measure failed to stop attacks on FSA troops and installations, a new policy was introduced: 'Remove the leaders by any means and the war will end'. When the FSA was attacked in any area, they took their revenge on those who may have been responsible in that particular area.

Deaths of targets of the Free Irish state

This is the list of Republicans that were killed by agents of the Provisional Government and the Free State Government in the period that the CID was in existence in Oriel House and at 88 Merrion Square. Memorial stones at the site where the bodies were found are situated all around Dublin at what was then the city limits. Most are documented on the website Irish War Memorials.
Harry Boland, 1 August 1922. Harry (34) had fought in Dublin and was now in hiding with his friend Joe Griffin, of the IRA's Intelligence Department. He was tracked down, with the aid of an informer, to the Grand Hotel, Skerries. Two Free State Army officers entered his room and Harry, unarmed, was shot and mortally wounded. He died two days later in St Vincent's Hospital, Dublin. As he lay dying, he refused to give the name of his attacker to his family but confirmed that it was a former comrade who had been in prison with him in 1916. Harry also had had a premonition of his death one week earlier, when he said "I know too much about Mick, and he won't let me live".
7 August 1922 Joe Hudson (18) lived at 3 Carrolls Cottages, Glasthule and was in command of a small group of ten IRA volunteers in the area. They were proving to be very successful locally against the FSA. This group operated down to Bray and across to Dean's Grange, where another group was based. On 7 August 1922, a group of FSA officers left Portobello Barracks, acting on information that a meeting was in progress in Hudson's home. The FSA officers, in two cars, pulled up near Hudson's, but a Fianna member on sentry duty blew his whistle to alert those inside Hudson's house. The occupants of the house scattered through the back garden as shots were exchanged. Hudson was injured and he dropped his weapon. An FSA officer approached him as he lay on the ground and shot him at point-blank range. He died the next day in Dún Laoghaire Hospital, but not before he gave a deathbed declaration that he had had his hands up when shot. The leader of the FSA group was Commandant Niall McNeill, whose father was a minister in the Provisional Government.

25 August 1922. One of the most notable murders of Republicans took place at Whitehall, Dublin on this date. Alfie (Leo) Colley (18), Parnell Street, and Sean Cole (17), Buckingham Street, were two of the most senior Fianna officers in the Dublin Brigade of Fianna Éireann. They were picked up at Newcomen Bridge, North Strand, on their way home from a meeting of officers at Marino. A witness stated that their abductors were wearing trench coats over Free State Army officers' uniforms. Witnesses saw them being shot dead at 'The Thatch', Puck's Lane, (now Yellow Road), Whitehall. Popular opinion at the time was that their killings were a reprisal for the death of Michael Collins earlier that week.
25 August 1922. Bernard Daly was taken from his place of employment at Nassau Street by armed men. His body was found later that day in a ditch on Malahide Road, Belcamp. He was a native of Old Hill, Drogheda.
2 September 1922. Leo Murray and Rodney Murphy were in hiding from the CID, who had threatened to 'riddle them' if caught. They were in hiding at Newpark Lodge, Stillorgan, in a friend's house, when they were shot in their beds by a squad of Free State Army officers from Portobello Barracks. Their homes had been raided three times in the previous week by the CID from Oriel House.

3 September 1922. J.J. Stephens worked for the Great Northern Railway Company in Dublin. He was a native of Belleek, Co Fermanagh and was an IRA volunteer in the city. He was taken from his lodgings at 7 Gardiner Place by armed men at 3.30 a.m. on 3 September and his body was found on the Naas Road at Blackhorse Bridge, Inchicore.
12 September 1922. Sean McEvoy was shot dead on Bishop Street and Peter Street after being captured following an IRA ambush of a National Army lorry on Curzon Street off the South Circular Road. He was a member of No. 4 Section, Active Service Unit (ASU), Dublin Brigade, IRA. Historian John Dorney records that McEvoy was in company with another IRA man named John Harwood who was shot but survived. 
16 September 1922. Patrick Mannion had taken part in the attack that evening on Oriel House. His squad retreated along Mount Street. There they encountered a patrol of Free State soldiers. Shots were exchanged and Mannion fell with a shattered leg. His comrades took his weapon and made their escape. Mannion was on the ground, with his hands in the surrender position, when he was shot dead.
23 September 1922. Michael Neville was at his place of employment, Mooney's Pub on Eden Quay, when he was abducted by three armed men. He was murdered at the old Killester Avenue Cemetery the same day. Neville was from Co Clare and his body was brought there for burial.
7 October 1922. Edwin Hughes (17) of K Company, 2 Battalion, Dublin Brigade, IRA, Brendan Holohan (17) of 2 Battalion, Dublin Brigade, IRA, and Joseph Rogers (16), were putting up republican posters on a wall at Clonliffe Road, Drumcondra, when they were arrested by Charlie Dalton and two other officers, all of the FSA Intelligence Dept. Their bullet-riddled bodies were found at the quarries on Naas Road, Clondalkin next morning.
5 November 1922. James 'Jim' Spain, aged 22, had taken part in the large-scale attack on the FSA at Wellington Barracks, South Circular Road. Wounded, he made his way to a house on Donore Avenue. He was dragged out of the house by FS soldiers and shot dead whilst unarmed outside 7 Susan Terrace.
25 November 1922. William Graham was stopped by an FSA patrol at Leeson Street Bridge after an attack on the Harcourt Street Railway Station. He was found to be carrying a revolver, which was taken from him. He was then shot dead on the spot by the officer.
29 December 1922. Frank Lawlor was aware that CID agents were looking for him. He was tracked down to a friend's house in Ranelagh and taken from there by the CID. His body was recovered at Milltown Golf Club.
23 March 1923. Thomas O'Leary was on the run and staying with a friend. He was arrested at a house on Upp. Rathmines Road and his body was found a few hundred yards away at Tranquilla Convent, 166 Upper Rathmines Road.
29 March 1923. Bobby Bonfield was a dental student. He was arrested at Leeson Street by President Cosgrave's bodyguard and his body was located the next day at Dowling's farm, Newland Cross, Clondalkin.

3 April 1923. Christopher Breslin was taken from his home at Mount Temple Road, Manor Street and Joseph Kiernan was arrested at Aungier Street. Their bodies were found at Ratoath Road, Cabra.
22 March 1923. Michael Neary was wounded and captured at Albert Road, Glenageary. An FSA officer shot him repeatedly in the lower body, and he died some days later in Dun Laoire Hospital.
17 April 1923 James Tierneywas investigating a CID 'safe house' or 'call house' at 81 Lower Dorset Street when he was attacked by a CID man who wrested his revolver from him and then shot him dead in the shop. Tierney was in company with Martin Hogan and was attached to No. 1 Section, Active Service Unit (ASU), Dublin Brigade, IRA. 
21 April 1923. Martin Hogan was abducted by a party of about ten men at Eccles Place, Dorset Street, whilst in the company of his girlfriend. His body was recovered at Grace Park Road, Whitehall next morning.
3 August 1923. The CID from Oriel House had told Henry McEntee's wife that they were going to 'riddle him' when caught. His body was found on Dubber Road, at the top of Jamestown Road, Finglas.
12 October 1923. Noel Lemass was abducted from Drury Street in July and his dismembered body was found at the Featherbed Mountains. He could only be identified by his clothing and spectacles.

Deaths of CID agents
In the same period, four CID men were killed in action, three by the IRA and one by Free State Army soldiers during a robbery at a factory.
25 September 1922. Patrick Murray was the driver to a party of six CID men that were seeking to arrest a Republican group at Deans Grange, Co. Dublin. A gunfight ensued and Murray was hit in the leg. He died in Dun Laoire hospital after the amputation of his leg.
29 December 1922. James Daly was a CID Inspector and he was leading a squad of men, raiding public houses along the North Quays, when he was shot. He died shortly afterwards in hospital.
17 September 1922. Anthony Deane was living in Oriel House. The IRA entered the house by a ruse and a gunfight broke out. Deane was killed instantly as he ran down the stairs.
19 October 1923. James Fitzgerald was the driver of one of the CID cars that responded to a robbery at Ashtown. He was in control of a prisoner when he was shot dead by a man who was a despatch rider in the FSA. His death led to the first execution by hanging in the new Irish Free State.

In addition to the above, a member of the Citizens' Defence Force {which would be absorbed into the CID} named William Johnson was shot and killed on 27 March 1923 by IRA Lt Frank Teeling who had objected to Johnson bringing a bag of tomatoes; Teeling was found guilty of manslaughter and served 18 months in prison.

Abolition and disbandment
The IRA called a cease-fire in April 1923. All arms were dumped and the Civil War officially came to an end. It is now estimated that twenty-two thousand republicans were interned at various camps around the country. Oriel House had become an embarrassment to the Free State Government because of its extrajudicial killings, so a decision was taken to terminate the CID. A problem arose now on how best to dispose of this large organisation that had served the government during the ten months of the war. There were three organisations disbanded at the same time: the CID, most of the Protection Corps and the Citizens Defence Force.

The CID was disbanded in November 1923 and a selection of its members was transferred to the DMP. The following extracts are taken from a letter from the Ministry of Home Affairs to the Executive Council of the Irish Free State.

"....."the CID shall be disbanded at an early date. This Department has no statutory constitution and its continued existence is not desirable......into this new body (which might be styled the "Detective Branch" of the DMP) there can be absorbed a selection of Oriel House men and such members of the "G" Division as may be suitable.:"

The new Detective Branch was put under the control of Colonel David Nelligan, Director of Intelligence in the FSA.

At the point of disbandment, there were still seventy-three personnel in the CID at 88 Merrion Square. Of these, twenty-eight were amalgamated with the DMP. Those that were disbanded got four weeks' wages. Captain Moynihan returned to the Postal Service at the GPO, but his position had been filled in his absence and he was therefore reduced in the ranks. He was despised by his colleagues in the Postal Service because of his interference in the postal workers' strike earlier in 1922.

"After the Civil War, this now notorious unit was disbanded because of its uncontrollability and murderousness"

"He (De Valera) had no confidence in the Special Branch of An Garda, the hard men of the police who gruesomely murdered Seán Lemass's brother, and who were essentially the remnants of Collins' old squad organised in Oriel House."

Legacy
Files obtainable from the National Archives give a short history of the setting up of the CID and personal details of over one hundred members of applicants to that agency. There are accounts of the deaths of CID members in action, lists of injured CID men, and finally a list of those suitable for retention for a new CID to replace the Oriel House model in 1924. Nothing remains of the activities of the CID against those who remained Republican after the Treaty or, of its association with the Free State Army (FSA) Intelligence Dept.

Unless relevant files on the activities of the FSA Intelligence Dept. and of those of the Oriel House CID are made available, historians will be left guessing. No in-depth study has ever been made on this subject and it now appears that a great cover-up was made when the CID of Oriel House was abolished. Even Seán Lemass, when he became a government minister in 1932, failed to find any files, information, or any clue that would point to the murderers of his brother Noel. As Sean McEntee stated in the Seanad in 1933, over 100,000 files had been destroyed in the Justice Department by those that had controlled Oriel House.

Michael Collins initiated the CID as a counter-revolutionary step. His FSA Intelligence Dept. ran and controlled the organisation for six months until the Home Affairs Ministry took over in August 1922. In 1962, Brian O'Higgins, author, scholar and former Sinn Féin TD from the Second Dáil of 1922, dedicated his 'Wolfe Tone Annual' to "The men of '22". This booklet enumerated all the Republicans that had been killed and executed by agents of the Free State Government during the Civil War period. Twenty-five of these deaths occurred in Dublin County, and it is in this area that this article is concentrating on.

It was stated in Dáil Éireann on 30 November 1922, during a debate on the financing of the CID, that over 2500 files had been gathered on the activities of opponents to the new state. None of these files are available today. In later years, in 1933, when Minister Seán MacEntee was addressing Seanad Éireann during the debate on the Garda Síochána estimates, he stated that over 100,000 files had been burned by the Home Affairs Dept.(Justice) at the changeover of government in 1932. There may yet be Military Archives at Cathal Brugha Barracks not cleared for the public to view.

References

Notes

Sources
Primary sources
Oriel House files at The National Archives, Bishop Street, Dublin. (Department of Justice and Department of An Taoiseach)
National newspapers of the above dates. (To be found at The National Library of Ireland)
Inquest evidence from Dublin Coroners Court at National Archives
'War News', (Republican Daily News Sheet) at the NLI.
Poblacht na h-Éireann, (Republican weekly newspaper, at NLI)
Éire-The Irish Nation, at NLI.

Secondary sources
Brian O'Higgins, Wolf Tone Annual, 1962.
Uinsionn MacEoin, Survivors, 1986.
David Fitzpatrick, Harry Boland's Irish Revolution, 2003.
John M. Regan, The Irish Counter-Revolution 1921–1936, 2001.
Tom Garvin, The birth of Irish democracy, 1996

Organisations based in the Irish Free State
Irish Civil War
Defunct law enforcement agencies of Ireland